Omar Khayyam (1048–1131) was a Persian poet, mathematician, philosopher and astronomer.

Omar Khayyam may also refer to:
 Omar Khayam (protester) (born 1983), British protester who dressed as a suicide bomber
 Omar Khayyam (crater), a lunar crater on the far side from the Earth
 Omar Khaiyyam, a 1946 Bollywood film
 Omar Khayyam (film), a 1957 film
 Omar Khayyam (silent film), much earlier
 The Omar Khayyam Show, Spike Milligan's remake of his series The Idiot Weekly
 Omar Khayyam (horse) (1914–1938), a British-born Thoroughbred racehorse
 Omar Khayyam Square, a city square in Nishapur, Iran
 Omar Khayyám (music), a 1900s choral work by Sir Granville Bantock

See also
 Kerry Wendell Thornley (1938–1998), co-founder of Discordianism, who wrote as Omar Khayyam Ravenhurst
 Omar the Tentmaker (film), a 1922 film directed by James Young and featuring Boris Karloff

Khayyam, Omar